Scott Young (born 5 April 1977) is a Scottish former professional footballer, turned manager.

Club career
Young started his career in his native Scotland, making a handful of appearances for St Johnstone and then Dunfermline. He moved to Northern Ireland in 1998 when he was signed by manager Roy Coyle for East Belfast club Glentoran. He was a key player and fan favourite, but suffered a torrid time with injuries, suffering three broken legs in two years, which eventually caused his retirement in 2006.

Management career
He succeeded Alan McDonald to become Glentoran manager on 1 March 2010 along with Pete Beaty as his assistant and Tim McCann as coach. Only a few weeks later after being appointed manager, he won the first trophy of his managerial career after leading the East Belfast side to the Irish League Cup with a win over Coleraine in the final.

Young signed a new contract just before the new season started, and Roy Coyle was appointed Director of Football. Young brought some talent out of players who were rarely utilised under previous manager McDonald. Matty Burrows was one of them after Burrows scored a goal against Portadown that was later nominated for the FIFA Puskás Award for goal of the year in 2010. Daryl Fordyce was another player that started playing very well at the start of the season. Against Lisburn Distillery, Fordyce scored five goals in a 6–1 win over Distillery. Young then led Glentoran to the County Antrim Shield after defeating arch rivals Linfield 3–1 in the final.

However, things did not go well for Young in the league, and Glentoran's off the field financial problems added to the struggle. In Young's second full season, he signed Coleraine pair Stephen Carson and Darren Boyce along with Linfield defender Aiden O'Kane and former Crusaders keeper Aaron Hogg. Young led Glentoran to the County Antrim Shield final again, but they lost out to Cliftonville in the final.

His lowest ebb came on 14 January 2012, after Glentoran were defeated at home in the Irish Cup fifth round by Northern Amateur League side Newington Youth Club. Young resigned the next day.

Personal life
His brother, David Young also moved from Scotland to Northern Ireland to play football. He played for Portadown.

Honours

Player
Glentoran
Irish Premier League (3): 1998–99, 2002–03, 2004–05
Irish Cup (3): 1999–2000, 2000–01, 2003–04
Irish League Cup (3): 2000–01, 2002–03, 2004–05
County Antrim Shield (5): 1998–99, 1999–2000, 2000–01, 2001–02, 2002–03
Gold Cup (3): 1998–99, 1999–2000, 2000–01

Manager
Glentoran
Irish League Cup (1): 2009–10
County Antrim Shield (1): 2010-11

References

External links

Living people
1977 births
Scottish footballers
Glentoran F.C. players
Glentoran F.C. managers
Dunfermline Athletic F.C. players
St Johnstone F.C. players
Scottish Football League players
Footballers from Glasgow
Association football midfielders
Scottish football managers